Tony Woods may refer to:

 Tony Woods (American football), (born 1965), American football linebacker in the National Football League
 Tony Woods (Australian footballer) (born 1969), Australian rules footballer in the Australian Football League
 Tony Woods (basketball), (born 1990), American basketball player
 Tony Woods (comedian), American comedian

See also
 Anthony Woods (born 1980), United States Army soldier discharged for violating the military's "Don't ask, don't tell" policy